Another Love may refer to:

Books
 Another Love (Hungarian: Törvényen belül), English translation of novella by Hungarian writer Erzsébet Galgóczi

Music

Songs
 "Another Love" (Tom Odell song)
 "Another Love" (Stories song), 1974
 "Another Love", song by B.B. King on 1963 album Mr. Blues
 "Another Love", a song by Gladys Knight & the Pips, 1964
 "Another Love", a song by Frankie Lee, 1966
 "Another Love", a song by Jeannie Carson, 1966
 "Another Love", song by Sophie Ellis-Bexter from the album Make a Scene
 "Another Love", song by Alice Smith from the album She
 "Another Love", song by Brian Culbertson from the album XII

See also
 Another Way (1982 film) (Hungarian: Egymásra nézve) Hungarian film directed by Károly Makk based on the novella
Another Love Song (disambiguation)